The 2005 Hel van het Mergelland was the 32nd edition of the Volta Limburg Classic cycle race and was held on 2 April 2005. The race started and finished in Eijsden. The race was won by Nico Sijmens.

General classification

References

2005
2005 in road cycling
2005 in Dutch sport